Paramoeba Parasite is a parasite that attacks the nervous system of lobsters. Lately, lobsters that have been pulled up in Western LIS have been dead with the parasite. Also, it caused almost all the deaths of the lobsters in 1999.

Effect on Sea Urchin Population 
Not only does the Paramoeba Parasite attack and kill lobsters, this parasite also attacks sea urchins. In Nova Scotia, Canada, an outbreak of this parasitic species within the sea urchin population in 2011 caused the death of very large numbers of sea urchins. The Paramoeba parasite has also been associated with multiple events of recurrent mass mortality in sea urchin populations along the coasts of Nova Scotia, Canada.

References

Veterinary parasitology